Green Desert is the twenty-seventh major release and the fifteenth studio album by electronic artists Tangerine Dream. The music was recorded in Berlin in 1973, during a period when Peter Baumann had temporarily left Germany to tour Nepal and India. Though unreleased at the time, it landed Tangerine Dream a record deal when Virgin heard the tapes.  A remixed version of the music was released in 1986.

The group had recently acquired new equipment including a Minimoog, a phaser, and an EKO ComputeRhythm which could be pre-programmed and/or changed on-the-fly while it was playing.  Chris Franke considered the six internal sounds to be "pretty lousy" but, due to its flexibility as a sequencer, later modified it as a controller to trigger external sounds.  This rhythmic effect was featured in several of Tangerine Dream's later albums.

Track listing
All songs written by Edgar Froese and Christopher Franke.

Personnel
 Edgar Froese - synthesizers, guitars, keyboards
 Christopher Franke - drums, percussion, synthesized percussion, synthesizers

Additional personnel
 Pete Beaulieu – engineering
 Mark Weinberg – sleeve design

References

1986 albums
Tangerine Dream albums